Nina Jakobsson (born 10 November 1994) is a Swedish football midfielder who plays for LSK Kvinner in Toppserien. She has won two caps for the Sweden women's national football team.

References

External links
 
 Nina Jakobsson at Piteå IF 
  (archive)
 
 

1994 births
Living people
Swedish women's footballers
Damallsvenskan players
Piteå IF (women) players
Women's association football midfielders
Sunnanå SK players
Hammarby Fotboll (women) players
LSK Kvinner FK players
People from Piteå
Sportspeople from Norrbotten County